Betty Winston Bayé  (April 12, 1946), an African-American journalist, columnist, and former member of the editorial board for the Courier-Journal newspaper in Louisville, Kentucky, United States, and Gannett is a journalist, former host of The Betty Baye Show TV program, and author. She is a former Vice President of the National Association of Black Journalists and an inductee into its Hall of Fame.

Personal 
Betty Winston Bayé was raised, along with her two sisters in New York City on the Lower East Side and East Harlem. Her parents were George and Betty Winston. Bayé didn't go to college right after high school. She was a clerical worker and in the late1960 chased after her dream to be an actress at The National Black Theater in Harlem under the direction of Barbara Ann Teer. In 1979, Bayé graduated with her bachelor's degree in Communications from Hunter College and in 1980 with her master's degree in journalism from The Columbia University, Graduate School of Journalism.

Career 
Bayé had several careers over her lifetime. She began as a clerical worker before she chose to go to college. Bayé first began her reporting career in Mt. Vernon, New York for the Daily Argus from 1980–1984. Then she became a reporter for The Courier-Journal from 1984–1986. At the Courier-Journal, Bayé joined the editorial board as an assistant city editor from 1986–1988 and then became its assistant neighbors editor from 1988–1990. From 1990–1991, she left the Courier to become a Nieman Fellow at Harvard. She returned to the newspaper after her leave at Harvard. She wrote for the Courier for almost thirty years and got laid off with many other workers by Gannett. In addition to her newspaper work, Bayé  contributed to magazines such as Essence Magazine, Main Man, and BlackAmericanWed.com. For six years, she hosted "The Betty Bayé Show" and she has appeared on the "Travis Smiley Show".

Bayé served as the vice president of the NABJ.

Notable works of journalism 
Bayé has published two books, "The Africans" in 1983 and "Blackbird" in 2000. Bayé contributed to collections "Family Affairs: What It Means to be African American Today", "Tribe Became a Nation", and "Work Sister Work". She is also mentioned in the book "Passing for Black: The Life and Careers of Mae Stret Kidd".

Context 
For years, the Courier-Journal newspaper had one black columnist on its editorial board and that was Betty Bayé. On June 21, 2011, Gannett Company downsized its staff and Bayé and many others on the editorial staff were laid off. The NABJ reported that out of the two percent that made up Gannett's staff, few or none were left. A study done by The American Society of News Editors said, "90 percent of newsroom supervisors from participating news organizations are white." Over the years different racial groups getting the chance to work and express themselves has decreased. "The fact is, if were not for black columnists who are thinking black, many of these [social] issues would not arise," said Betty Baye. After her lay off Betty became an independent journalist, published novelist, motivational speaker, and story teller. She uses these as ways to reach out to other African Americans to defend their importance as people just as any other race. Her writings often open eyes to a point of view you may never see.

Impact 
Bayé is a journalist, TV interviewer, author and lecturer. She was a longtime employee of the Gannett Company. Her career in journalism spanned 32 years, and she worked for The Courier-Journal for 27 year as a journalist columnist and member of its editorial board. She has hosted her own show “The Betty Baye Show” for 6 years. She also chairs the University of Louisville Black Family Conference.

Writings 
 Betty Bayé, "Let's Talk Black", in Thinking Black: Some of the Nation's Best Black Columnists Speak Their Mind, edited by Dewayne Wikham. Crown Publishing Group, 1997.
 Betty Bayé, Blackbird. Newport News, Va.: August Press, 2000.

Awards 
 NABJ Hall of Fame 2013
 Simmons College of Kentucky, honorary doctorate of humanities

See also 
National Association of Black Journalists Hall of Fame

References 

1946 births
Living people
African-American women journalists
African-American journalists
American women journalists
Journalists from New York City
21st-century African-American people
21st-century African-American women
20th-century African-American people
20th-century African-American women